was a Japanese mathematician who made significant contributions to the theory of operator algebras.

He became deaf at the age of two. He was described as a "very singular" personality.

Although he published relatively little, his 1967 manuscript on the theory of modular automorphisms of von Neumann algebras was of major importance in the field. The manuscript was difficult to understand, but Masamichi Takesaki was able to revise it. In the summer of 1967 Takesaki communicated the results to Jacques Dixmier, and they became a major influence on the work of his student Alain Connes on the classification of type III factors. The theory later became known as Tomita-Takesaki theory.

References

20th-century Japanese mathematicians
21st-century Japanese mathematicians
1924 births
2015 deaths